Goluboy Dunay River ( - Sky blue Danube) is a river in Voronezh Oblast of Russia. It is a left tributary of the Don River. It flows over the north-western part of Voronezh. Most of the river's waters are from melting snow.

References 

Rivers of Voronezh Oblast
Tributaries of the Don